Lourdes Yoana Juárez Trejo (born 19 December 1986) is a Mexican professional boxer who has held the WBC female super flyweight title since 2020. As of December 2020, she is ranked as the world's best active female super flyweight by The Ring and second by BoxRec. She is the younger sister of former world champion boxer Mariana Juárez.

Professional career
Juárez made her professional debut on 26 October 2013, scoring a fourth-round knockout (KO) victory against Gabriela Martinez at the Deportiva Agustín Ramos Millan in Toluca, Mexico. After two more victories—both by unanimous decision (UD)—Juárez suffered two consecutive defeats in 2014; losing via second-round technical knockout (TKO) against Jazmin Ortega in February and a four-round split decision (SD) against Brisa Hernández in April.

Following the defeats she embarked on a 14-fight winning streak before facing future world champion Yesenia Gómez on 24 September 2016 at the Oasis Hotel Complex in Cancún, Mexico. The bout was stopped in the fourth round of a scheduled eight-rounder after Gómez suffered a cut from an accidental clash of heads, resulting in the fight being ruled a no contest (NC).

She scored three more victories, one by TKO, before challenging for her first title—the WBC FECOMBOX female flyweight title—against Cecilia Santoscoy on 2 September 2017 at the Centro de Espectáculos de la Feria de León in León, Mexico. Juárez defeated Santoscoy via ten-round UD to capture the regional WBC title. She made one successful defence, defeating Diana Fernández via ten-round SD in November.

After eight more victories, one by TKO, she challenged for the WBC female super flyweight title against reigning champion Guadalupe Martínez Guzmán on 12 December 2020 at the Studios Televisa in Mexico City. In a fight which saw both boxers trade punches at close range throughout the fight, with Lourdes' being the more accurate of the two, she defeated Guzmán via UD to capture her first world title. Two judges scored the bout 97–93 and the third scored it 96–93.

Professional boxing record

References

External links

Living people
1986 births
Mexican women boxers
Boxers from Mexico City
Light-flyweight boxers
Flyweight boxers
Super-flyweight boxers
World Boxing Council champions